The Japanese media franchise BanG Dream!, created by Bushiroad in 2015, consists of seven bands whose members portray fictional characters in the anime series and mobile game BanG Dream! Girls Band Party!. The bands consist of Poppin'Party (founded in 2015), Roselia, Afterglow, Pastel Palettes, and Hello, Happy World! (2017), Raise A Suilen (2018), and Morfonica (2020). MyGO!!!!!, another band in the franchise but not tied to the seven in Girls Band Party!, debuted in 2022.

Each of the seven bands have released singles and albums, which feature songs that are playable in Girls Band Party!. While the singles and albums contain original songs, the franchise has also produced albums featuring cover versions of popular music performed by the groups. Other singles include image songs by Poppin'Party, those from non-major bands like Glitter Green, and products of collaborations.

The franchise's music is produced by Elements Garden. Kō Nakamura and Asuka Oda serve as the franchise's lyricists, with the former writing lyrics for most Poppin'Party songs while the latter does so for the other groups.

Article updated . This list does not cover music released by the side project Argonavis from BanG Dream!, which became independent from the franchise in 2021 as from Argonavis.

Albums

Studio albums

Cover albums

Live albums

Anime albums

Singles

Band singles

Poppin'Party

Roselia

Raise A Suilen

Morfonica

Afterglow

Pastel Palettes

Hello, Happy World!

Other singles

MyGO!!!!!

Collaborations

Tie-up songs
"Tie-up" songs are original songs composed by outside artists and performed by the BanG Dream! groups. Such partnerships also include an accompanying music video and the bands performing a cover of their collaborator's own music. The series began in 2021.

Extra songs
"Extra" songs are collaborations between BanG Dream! and outside artists in which both perform a duet cover of the latter's own music. Like with tie-up songs, extras began in 2021, have music videos, and are playable in Girls Band Party!.

Notes

References

External links
 BanG Dream! discographies page at official website 
 Discographies at English official website

Anime soundtracks
D
Bushiroad
Video game music discographies
Film and television discographies